The Under-20 CONMEBOL Libertadores (Portuguese and Spanish: CONMEBOL Libertadores Sub-20) is the international association football club competition for teams that play in CONMEBOL leagues. It was created by Manuel Burga Seoane and the Peruvian Football Federation. The competition started in the 2011 season in response to the increased interest in youth football.

History
The tournament had only two editions from 2011 to 2012. The first edition of this U-20 club competition was played in Lima, Peru. Players born on or after 1 January 1990 were eligible to compete in the first tournament, technically making it an under-21 competition. The tournament was originally going to be hosted in November 2010, however, because of the postponement, the player age eligibility was changed.

The tournament was temporarily discontinued after 2012. CONMEBOL was targeting to restart the competition in 2015. In March 2015, the CONMEBOL Executive Committee approved Paraguay as host of the next U-20 Copa Libertadores in January 2016.

Format
The cup is played by twelve teams, one from each CONMEBOL country, divided in three groups of four clubs each. The group winners and the best second-placed team qualify to play the semifinals and the winners then play the final, while the losers play the third-place game.

Winners

Performances by club

Performances by nation

Honors

Performance by club
Legend
 — Champions
 — Runners-up
 — Third place
 — Fourth place 
QF — Quarterfinals
GS — Group stage
 — Did not qualify

References

External links
 

 
Copa Libertadores
CONMEBOL club competitions
Under-20 association football
Copa Libertadores